Ungdom mot EU (Youth against the EU) is the youth organization of Nei til EU, opposing a future Norwegian membership of and adaption to the European Union (EU). Their main arguments against a Norwegian membership of the EU are democracy, environmental concerns and solidarity, claiming that the EU undermines democratic processes, damages the environment and is a hindrance for the economic growth of developing countries.

Leaders of Ungdom mot EU

References

External links
Official website

Political organisations based in Norway
Youth organisations based in Norway